W. Martin Fair (born 1964) is a minister of the Church of Scotland and was Moderator of its General Assembly from May 2020– May 2021. He has also served as the minister at St Andrews Parish Church in Arbroath, Angus since 1992.

Early life and education 
Fair grew up in Thornliebank on the southside of Glasgow, Scotland. Dr Fair was brought up in Spiersbridge Church, now called Thornliebank Parish Church, and his wife Elaine, a primary school teacher by profession, was his childhood sweetheart. They were married on 4 July 1987. The couple grew up on the same street and attended the same school.

Ordained ministry 
He has served as the Minister of St Andrew's Parish Church, Arbroath for the whole of his ministry, since being ordained in 1992.

He has served on the Mission & Discipleship Council of the denomination, becoming a vice-convener in time, chairing the Church Without Walls committee.

On 21 October 2019, it was announced that he had been nominated as the next Moderator of the General Assembly of the Church of Scotland. He was elected to the position by a Commission of Assembly and installed on 16 May 2020.  Uniquely, due to the COVID-19 pandemic, Dr Fair was installed as Moderator in a special ceremony attended by a handful of people but live-streamed to the Kirk. Dr Fair moderated an online Assembly held in October 2020 in place of the usual Assembly which would have been held in May 2020. He was succeeded as Moderator by Jim Wallace, Baron Wallace of Tankerness in May 2021.

Personal life 
He was born in Glasgow in 1964. He is married to Elaine; they have three sons: Callum, 23, Andrew, 20 and Fraser, 18 (ages as of October 2019).

In the autumn of 2017 he fell awkwardly and was left without the use of his left arm.

See also 
 List of Moderators of the General Assembly of the Church of Scotland

References 

20th-century Ministers of the Church of Scotland
Living people
Moderators of the General Assembly of the Church of Scotland
1964 births
21st-century Ministers of the Church of Scotland